Alibi  is a 1931 British mystery detective film directed by Leslie S. Hiscott and starring Austin Trevor, Franklin Dyall, and Elizabeth Allan.

The film was adapted from the 1928 play Alibi by Michael Morton which was in turn based on the 1926 Agatha Christie novel The Murder of Roger Ackroyd featuring her famous Belgian detective Hercule Poirot.

Austin Trevor once claimed he was cast as Poirot because he could speak with a French accent. It was the first of three Poirot adaptations made by Twickenham Film Studios in the 1930s, followed by Black Coffee the same year, and Lord Edgware Dies in 1934, all starring Trevor as Poirot. He later appeared in The Alphabet Murders, a 1965 Christie film, playing a minor role.

It is now considered to be a lost film.

Plot summary

Cast 
 Austin Trevor as Hercule Poirot  
 Franklin Dyall as Sir Roger Ackroyd  
 Elizabeth Allan as Ursula Browne  
 J.H. Roberts as Dr. Sheppard  
 John Deverell as Lord Halliford  
 Ronald Ward as Ralph Ackroyd  
 Mary Jerrold as Mrs. Ackroyd  
 Mercia Swinburne as Caryll Sheppard  
 Harvey Braban as Inspector Davis  
 Clare Greet    
 Diana Beaumont as Flora Ackroyd
 Earl Grey

References

Bibliography
 Aldridge, Mark. Agatha Christie on Screen. Springer, 2016.

External links
 Alibi (1931) at IMDB
 

1931 films
1930s English-language films
British detective films
British mystery drama films
1930s mystery drama films
Films directed by Leslie S. Hiscott
Films based on Hercule Poirot books
Lost British films
British black-and-white films
British films based on plays
Films based on adaptations
1931 lost films
Lost drama films
1931 drama films
1930s British films